Club Atlético Alto Perú are a football club from Montevideo in Uruguay. The club were affiliated with the second division amateur of the Uruguayan Football Association at the third level, which is the bottom and the only amateur level of the pyramid, named the second amateur division.

Titles
Uruguayan Primera División: 0
Amateur Era (0):
Professional Era (0):

Segunda División Uruguay: 0

Segunda División Amateur Uruguay: 1
 Torneo Apertura 2006

External links

Football clubs in Uruguay
Association football clubs established in 1940
Football clubs in Montevideo
1940 establishments in Uruguay